Upper Brookfield is an outer western suburb in the City of Brisbane, Queensland, Australia.

Geography
Upper Brookfield is a mountainous rural suburb consisting of acreage properties.

Marshalls Flat is a plain alongside Moggill Creek in the centre of the suburb. It named after husband and wife Arthur John (Jack) Marshall (1913-2003) and Kathleen Bell Marshall (1915-2005), owners and farmer of the flats from 1944 to 1976.

History 

Upper Brookfield is named after its neighbouring suburb Brookfield. The name came into use about 1910 but it was not officially named and bounded until 11 August 1975.

In 1914 there was a sale of 23 fruit farm blocks of land in the vicinity of Upper Brookfield Road and its junctions with Kittani Street and Pacey Road (near the Upper Brookfield State School). It was called the Brookfield Fruit Farms Estate and was marketed by W.R. Moon. The land was described as "virgin scrub" suitable for growing bananas, pineapples and vegetables.

Upper Brookfield State School (also known as Brookfield Upper State School) opened on 1916 but closed in 1921 due to low student numbers. It reopened in 1923.

In March 1933 local resident decided to raise funds to erect a public hall. Fred Meilandt offered to donate the land, while others donated timber and cash. A working bee began clearing the land on 24 June 1933 with construction of the ball commencing in September 1933.

A Methodist church opened in Upper Brookfield on Saturday 29 November 1952. The local congregation had met in other locations for 17 years before establishing their own church. It was ajact to the public hall at 508 Upper Brookfield Road. With the amalgamation of the Methodist Church into the Uniting Church in Australia in 1977, it became the Upper Brookfield Uniting Church. It closed in November 2001 and in April 2003 the church building was relocated to the Moreton Bay College in Manly West (operated by the Uniting Church) to become their Centenary Chapel.

The median age of the Upper Brookfield population was 42 years, 5 years above the Australian median. 78.7% of people living in Upper Brookfield were born in Australia, compared to the national average of 69.8%; the next most common countries of birth were England 6%, South Africa 2%, New Zealand 1.8%, Netherlands 1.4%, United States of America 1.1%. 96% of people speak only English at home; the next most common languages were 0.6% Dutch, 0.6% German, 0.5% French, 0.5% Italian, 0.5% Spanish.

Of these 49.2% were male and 50.8% were female. Aboriginal and/or Torres Strait Islander people made up 0.5% of the population. The median age of people was 42 years. Children aged 0 – 14 years made up 21.9% of the population and people aged 65 years and over made up 14.4% of the population. The most common responses for religion were No Religion, so described 42.1%, Catholic 14.9%, Not stated 13.6%, Anglican 10.3% and Uniting Church 6.1%. In Upper Brookfield (State Suburbs), No Religion, so described was the largest religious group reported overall (49.1%) (this figure excludes not stated responses). The most common countries of birth for male parents were Australia 59.1%, England 9.8%, South Africa 3.3%, New Zealand 2.8% and Netherlands 2.5%. The most common countries of birth for female parents were Australia 60.2%, England 7.9%, South Africa 3.3%, Netherlands 2.8% and New Zealand 1.9%. 87.1% of people only spoke English at home. The only other responses for language spoken at home were German 1.6%, Spanish 0.8%, Dutch 0.5% and Italian 0.4%. There were 393 people who reported being in the labour force in the week before Census night. Of these 55.0% were employed full time, 34.6% were employed part-time and 5.6% were unemployed. Of employed people, 17.1% worked 1 to 15 hours, 10.6% worked 16 to 24 hours and 43.1% worked 40 hours or more. Of people aged 15 years and over, 62.4% were married and 7.7% were either divorced or separated.

Heritage listings 
Upper Brookfield has heritage-listed sites, including:

 693A Gold Creek Road: Gold Creek Reservoir

Education 

Upper Brookfield State School is a government primary (Prep-6) school for boys and girls at 496 Upper Brookfield Road. In 2018, the school had an enrolment of 54 students with 7 teachers (4 full-time equivalent) and 6 non-teaching staff (3 full-time equivalent).

There is no secondary school in Upper Brookfield. The nearest secondary school in Kenmore State High School in Kenmore to the south-east.

Amenities 

Upper Brookfield Community Hall is at 506 Upper Brookfield Road.

References

External links

 

 

Suburbs of the City of Brisbane